Hugh John Morgan-Owen  (1882 – 6 March 1953) was a Welsh international footballer.

Morgan-Owen was born at St Asaph, Flintshire, son of Timothy Morgan-Owen, and educated at Shrewsbury School and Oxford University, where he was a football Blue against Cambridge University. Later he played in London for the Corinthians.

Morgan-Owen was part of the Wales national football team between 1900 and 1907, playing 5 matches and scoring 2 goals. He played his first match on 26  March 1900 against England and his last match on 4 March 1907 against Scotland.

Morgan-Owen also played cricket at county level for Montgomeryshire and, in 1904, for Shropshire on one occasion when he made 23 runs and took two wickets.

His brother Morgan Morgan-Owen was also a Welsh international footballer.

See also
 List of Wales international footballers (alphabetical)

References

1882 births
1953 deaths
Sportspeople from St Asaph
Welsh footballers
Wales international footballers
Association footballers not categorized by position